Baby I'm-a Want You is the fourth album by Bread, released in 1972.  Its singles included the title cut (which reached No. 3 on the Billboard Top 100), "Everything I Own" (No. 5), "Mother Freedom" (No. 37), and "Diary" (No. 15). This was the first Bread album to feature keyboard player Larry Knechtel.

Track listing
Side one
"Mother Freedom" (David Gates) – 2:35
"Baby I'm-a Want You" (Gates) – 2:31
"Down on My Knees" (James Griffin, Gates) – 2:44
"Everything I Own" (Gates) – 3:07
"Nobody Like You" (Larry Knechtel, Griffin) – 3:14 
"Diary" (Gates) – 3:09
Side two
"Dream Lady" (Griffin, Robb Royer) – 3:22
"Daughter" (Gates) – 3:23
"Games of Magic" (Griffin, Royer) – 3:10
"This Isn't What the Governmeant" (Gates) – 2:27
"Just Like Yesterday" (Griffin) – 2:15
"I Don't Love You" (Griffin) – 2:49

Personnel
David Gates - vocals, guitars, bass, Moog, violin
James Griffin - vocals, guitars, piano
Larry Knechtel - piano, bass, Hammond organ, harmonica, guitars, keyboards 
Mike Botts - drums, percussion
Robb Royer - bass on "Mother Freedom"

Charts

Weekly charts

Year-end charts

Certifications

References

1972 albums
Bread (band) albums
Elektra Records albums
Albums produced by David Gates
Albums produced by Jimmy Griffin